Aron Chmielewski (born October 9, 1991) is a Polish professional ice hockey player. He currently plays for HC Oceláři Třinec of the Czech Extraliga and the Polish national team.

Professional career
He started his professional career with Stoczniowiec Gdańsk in 2009. After two seasons in Gdańsk, he moved to Cracovia in 2011. He spent a total of three seasons in Cracovia, leading the team in points at the end of the 2013–14 season, producing 69 points in 48 games.

In April 2014, Chmielewski transferred to HC Oceláři Třinec of the Czech Extraliga, and made his debut during the 2014–15 Czech Extraliga season. In September 2014, he was loaned to AZ Havířov of the Czech 1. League, the second level ice hockey league in the country. He spent the 2014–15 season playing for both clubs. 
In the 2015–16 season, he found himself in a similar arrangement to the previous season, splitting time between HC Oceláři Třinec and on loan with the (Czech 2. League team HC Frýdek-Místek.

International career
Chmielewski started his national team career playing for Poland's U18 team at the IIHF World U18 Championship (Division I) in both 2008 and 2009.

He played for the Polish U20 team at the IIHF World U20 Championship in 2010 (Division I) and 2011 (Division II).

He later joined Poland's national team, playing at the 2014 IIHF World Championship Division I and 2015 IIHF World Championship Division I.

Personal life
His father was also a professional hockey player. He is a member of the Pentecostal church, and has been married to Paulina Chmielewska since July 2012.

Career statistics

Regular season and playoffs

References

External links

1991 births
Living people
AZ Havířov players
HC Frýdek-Místek players
HC Oceláři Třinec players
MKS Cracovia (ice hockey) players
Polish ice hockey forwards
Sportspeople from Gdańsk
Stoczniowiec Gdańsk players
Polish expatriate ice hockey people
Polish expatriate sportspeople in the Czech Republic
Expatriate ice hockey players in the Czech Republic